Raúl de Armas (born 1941) is a Cuban-born architect who has designed and completed many major buildings in the United States, Europe, Canada, and the Middle East in his career of more than 35 years, winning numerous design awards.

De Armas came to New York in 1958 at the age of 17.  He studied architecture at Cornell University.

Until he resigned in 1991, he was a partner at Skidmore, Owings & Merrill in charge of interior design for their New York office. Since 1992, he has been a partner in the firm of MdeAS Architects (formerly Moed de Armas), which he helped found, in New York, NY.

Awards 
 CINTAS Foundation Lifetime Achievement Award, 2016–17 
American Institute of Architects AIA Twenty-five Year Award, 2010 - Haj Terminal/King Abdul Aziz International Airport
 Salvadori Center Founder's Award for Excellence in Design, 2008 - Moed de Armas & Shannon
 Institute of Business Designers Award, Citation, 1992 - Knoll Palio Collection
 INARCH, Citation, 1990 - San Benigno Torre Nord ("Il Matitone"), Genoa, Italy
 Interior Design Awards, First Place, Independent Restaurants, 1988 - Palio Restaurant, New York
 American Institute of Architects, New York Chapter, Citation, 1986 - Irving Trust Operations Center, New York
 American Institute of Architects, New York Chapter, Citation, 1986 - Prudential at Princeton "Enerplex"
 Interiors Magazine "Designer of the Year", 1984, - projects including Irving Trust Operations Center and Manufacturers Hanover Trust Corporation Headquarters
 Aga Khan Award for Architecture, 1983 - planning of the Haj Terminal/King Abdul Aziz International Airport
 Concrete Industry Board Annual Award, 1983 - 780 Third Avenue, New York
 Fifth Avenue Association Commercial Building Award 1983 - Park Avenue Plaza, New York
 Reliance Development Group Award, Distinguished Architecture, 1982 - Park Avenue Plaza, New York
 Progressive Architecture award, 1981

See also
Citicorp @ Court Square - building designed by Raul de Armas
780 Third Avenue - building designed by Raul de Armas

Notes

External links
 "Raul de Armas" webpage at Moed, de Armas & Shannon Architects

Cuban architects
Living people
1941 births